Balanced Rock is one of the most popular features of Arches National Park, situated in Grand County, Utah, United States. Balanced Rock is located next to the park's main road, at about 9.2 miles (14.8 km) from the park entrance. It is one of only a few prominent features clearly visible from the road.

The total height of Balanced Rock is 128 feet (39 m), with the balancing rock rising 55 feet (16.75 m) above the base. This rock is the largest of its kind in the park, weighing approximately 3,577 tons, the same as an icebreaker ship or 27 blue whales. Balanced Rock had a smaller sibling named "Chip-Off-the-Old-Block" that collapsed in the winter of 1975–76, the eventual fate of this feature as well.

There is also a short loop trail leading around the base of the rock.

See also
Balanced Rock (Garden of the Gods)
Balancing rock

References

External links
 Arches National Park Balanced Rock page
 Balanced Rock of the Hudson Valley – Large perched rock and possible Druid Dolmen located in North Salem, NY
 

Arches National Park
Landforms of Grand County, Utah
Landmarks in Utah
Rock formations of Utah